The Eccles Establishment was an Anglican mission to India in the 19th and 20th centuries.

Notes

Christian missions in India